James White was Archdeacon of Armagh from 1497 until his death in 1530: he was also Prebendary of Kene in Armagh cathedral.

Notes

Archdeacons of Armagh
15th-century Irish Roman Catholic priests
16th-century Irish Roman Catholic priests
1530 deaths